Hairspray: Original Broadway Cast Recording is the cast album for the 2002 musical Hairspray. The show is an adaptation of the 1988 film of the same name. It features performances from the show's cast, which includes Harvey Fierstein, Linda Hart, Dick Latessa, Kerry Butler, Clarke Thorell, Mary Bond Davis, Laura Bell Bundy, Matthew Morrison, Corey Reynolds, and Marissa Jaret Winokur as the lead character of Tracy Turnblad. The cast recording earned the 2003 Grammy Award for Best Musical Theater Album.

Album information
The cast recording contains seventeen songs from the musical, with music by Marc Shaiman and lyrics by Scott Wittman. The book for the musical is by Thomas Meehan and Mark O'Donnell. Hairspray's music is written and performed to conform to the story's 1962 setting, with influences spanning the genres of doo-wop, rock and roll, soul, and pop.

Sony released the recording on August 13, 2002 (ASIN: B00006AALQ).

Track listing
All tracks written by Marc Shaiman and Scott Wittman.
"Good Morning Baltimore" – Tracy and Company (3:41)
"The Nicest Kids in Town" – Corny and Council Members (2:37)
"Mama, I'm a Big Girl Now" – Edna, Tracy, Velma, Amber, Prudy, and Penny (3:18)
"I Can Hear the Bells" – Tracy and Company (4:05)
"(The Legend of) Miss Baltimore Crabs" – Velma and Council Members with Tracy, Penny, and Little Inez (2:53)
"It Takes Two" – Link, Tracy, and Men (3:06)
"Welcome to the 60's" – Tracy, Edna, The Dynamites, and Company (3:58)
"Run and Tell That!" – Seaweed, Little Inez, and Detention Kids (3:49)
"Big, Blonde and Beautiful" – Motormouth, Little Inez, Tracy, Edna, Wilbur, and Company (4:37)
"The Big Dollhouse" – Matron, Edna, Velma, Tracy, Amber, Penny, Motormouth, Little Inez, Female Ensemble (3:15)
"Good Morning Baltimore (Reprise)" – Tracy (1:34)
"(You're) Timeless to Me" – Wilbur and Edna (4:09)
"Without Love" – Link, Tracy, Seaweed, and Penny (4:27)
"I Know Where I've Been" – Motormouth and Company (4:02)
"(It's) Hairspray" – Corny and Council Members (2:12)
"Cooties" – Amber and Council Members (1:32)
"You Can't Stop the Beat" – Tracy, Link, Penny, Seaweed, Edna, Wilbur, Motormouth, Amber, Velma, and Company (5:07)
"Blood on the Pavement" (attached with "You Can't Stop the Beat") – Amber, Link, Velma, and Council Members (0:32)*

*Cut song, but it is included as a hidden song, playing after "You Can't Stop the Beat''

Additional songs and score changes
As the soundtrack was recorded before previews in New York had begun, several songs in the stage show now differ from their respective recordings on the album, most notably "(The Legend of) Miss Baltimore Crabs" and "Cooties".

In addition, certain musical numbers were excised for the cast album entirely, including "The Nicest Kids in Town (Reprise)" and "Velma's Revenge" (a reprise of "(The Legend of) Miss Baltimore Crabs"). "The Madison",  another one of these numbers, occurs after "(The Legend of) Miss Baltimore Crabs" and is sung by Corny and Company. The song, however, was included on the 2-Disc Collector's Soundtrack titled "Boink-Boink".

Personnel

Main vocalists
Marissa Jaret Winokur as Tracy Turnblad
Clarke Thorell as Corny Collins
Laura Bell Bundy as Amber Von Tussle
Kerry Butler as Penny Lou Pingleton
Harvey Fierstein as Edna Turnblad
Linda Hart as Velma Von Tussle
Jackie Hoffman as Prudy Pingleton/Matron
Matthew Morrison as Link Larkin
Corey Reynolds as Seaweed J. Stubbs
Danelle Eugenia Wilson as Little Inez
Mary Bond Davis as Motormouth Maybelle
Dick Latessa as Wilbur Turnblad
Joel Vig as Mr. Pinky

The Dynamites
Shayna Steele (Welcome to the 60's, I Know Where I've Been)
Kamilah Martin (Welcome to the 60's)
Judine Richárd (Welcome to the 60's)

Council Members
(The Nicest Kids in Town, (The Legend of) Miss Baltimore Crabs, (It's) Hairspray, You Can't Stop the Beat)
Peter Matthew Smith as Brad
Hollie Howard as Tammy
John Hill as Fender
Jennifer Gambatese as Brenda
Adam Fleming as Sketch
Shoshana Bean as Shelley
Todd Michel Smith as I.Q.
Katharine Leonard as Lou Ann

Record Shop Kids
(Run and Tell That, Big, Blonde, and Beautiful, I Know Where I've Been, You Can't Stop the Beat)
Eric B. Anthony as Duane
Eric Dysart as Gilbert
Danielle Lee Greaves as Lorraine
Rashad Naylor as Thad

Production
Marc Shaiman: producer
Thomas Meehan: producer
Lon Hoyt: music director

Charts

Year-end charts

See also
 Hairspray: Original Motion Picture Soundtrack (1988)
 Hairspray: Soundtrack to the Motion Picture (2007)

References

Cast recordings
2002 soundtrack albums
Theatre soundtracks